Michael Paliotta (born April 6, 1993) is an American former professional ice hockey defenseman. Paliotta was selected by the Chicago Blackhawks in the 3rd round (70th overall) of the 2011 NHL Entry Draft. He played in the National Hockey League (NHL) with the Blackhawks and the Columbus Blue Jackets.

Playing career
As a youth, Paliotta played in the 2006 Quebec International Pee-Wee Hockey Tournament with the New York Rangers minor ice hockey team.

On March 26, 2015, the Chicago Blackhawks signed Paliotta to two-year contract, and on April 11, 2015 he made his NHL debut skating against the Colorado Avalanche in the Blackhawks' final game of the 2014–15 regular season. Paliotta was among the Blackhawks train on squad during the playoffs, in which the Blackhawks claimed their third championship in six years.

His tenure with Chicago was short-lived as on June 30, 2015, he was included in the trade of Brandon Saad to the Columbus Blue Jackets in exchange for Jeremy Morin, Marko Dano, Artem Anisimov, Corey Tropp and a fourth-round draft pick in 2016.

After one season with the Blue Jackets, and having completed his entry-level contract, Paliotta was not tendered a qualifying offer to remain with the club. As a free agent Paliotta was signed to a one-year, two-way contract with the New York Rangers on July 1, 2016. He spent the duration of the 2016–17 season, with AHL affiliate, the Hartford Wolf Pack.

On July 14, 2017, Paliotta signed as a free agent to a one-year AHL contract with the Toronto Marlies. He appeared in 8 scoreless games with the Marlies to start the 2017–18 season before he was traded to the Texas Stars on January 11, 2018.

Paliotta went un-signed from the Texas Stars over the summer, before agreeing as a free agent to a one-year AHL contract with the Stockton Heat, affiliate to the Calgary Flames on September 14, 2018. In the 2018–19 season, Pailotta recorded 4 assists in 32 games from the blueline for the Heat.

At the conclusion of his contract with the Heat, Paliotta familiarly continued his journeyman career, agreeing to a one-year AHL contract with the Binghamton Devils, affiliate to the New Jersey Devils, on August 29, 2019.

Career statistics

Regular season and playoffs

International

Awards and honors

References

External links
 

1993 births
Living people
AHCA Division I men's ice hockey All-Americans
American men's ice hockey defensemen
Binghamton Devils players
Chicago Blackhawks draft picks
Chicago Blackhawks players
Columbus Blue Jackets players
Hartford Wolf Pack players
Lake Erie Monsters players
Stockton Heat players
Texas Stars players
Toronto Marlies players
USA Hockey National Team Development Program players
Vermont Catamounts men's ice hockey players